Bramwell is an unincorporated community in Gem County, in the U.S. state of Idaho.

History
The first settlement at Bramwell was made in 1902. The community was named after Franklin S. Bramwell, a Mormon leader.

References

Unincorporated communities in Gem County, Idaho